Reformed Dutch Church of Rensselaer in Watervliet (also known as Component No. 19) is a historic Reformed Dutch church at 210 Old Loudon Road in the hamlet of Latham, town of Colonie, Albany County, New York.  It was built in 1817 in a vernacular Greek Revival style.  It has a pedimented roof and corner pilasters.  It features a square cupola with a single bell atop the roof with a large channeled cornice with a low pitch roof.  It served as a church until 1886 and since then, has been used as a feed store, public meeting hall, chapel, architect firm and most recently, as a theater for stage productions.

It was listed on the National Register of Historic Places in 1985.

External links
Town of Colonie (includes Latham)
Latham, NY - Latham's Corners

References

 

Reformed Church in America churches in New York (state)
Churches on the National Register of Historic Places in New York (state)
Churches completed in 1817
19th-century Reformed Church in America church buildings
Churches in Albany County, New York
1817 establishments in New York (state)
National Register of Historic Places in Albany County, New York